is a Japanese judoka.

She started judo at the age of 6.

Her favorite techniques are Ōuchi gari and Newaza.

She won the bronze medal in the half-lightweight (−52 kg) division at the World Judo Championships in 2013.

References

External links
 
 

1989 births
Living people
Japanese female judoka
Universiade medalists in judo
Universiade gold medalists for Japan
Universiade bronze medalists for Japan
Medalists at the 2011 Summer Universiade
21st-century Japanese women